Barbara Shirin Davidavičius (born 11 April 1995), known professionally as Shirin David, is a German rapper, singer and former YouTuber.

Early life 
Shirin David was born in Hamburg, Germany, to an Iranian father and Lithuanian mother and has one younger sister. She graduated from a school of opera singing, dancing and acting in Hamburg. David currently lives in Berlin. She was raised by a single mother after her father abandoned the family.

Career
David started her YouTube channel in March 2014. As of July 2021, she was the 63rd most subscribed channel in Germany with over 2.7 million subscribers. In 2015, she reached the top 10 of the German Charts as a feature on German R&B singer Ado Kojo's song "Du liebst mich nicht", a cover of the song with the same name by German rapper Sabrina Setlur. In February 2016, it was reported that David had cancelled her contract with YouTube network TubeOne Networks, who had made her famous. In 2017, she was one of four judges at Deutschland sucht den Superstar, the German version of American Idol. She moved to Berlin in 2018, having lived in Cologne for more than three years previously.

In January 2019, David released her first official single, "Orbit", which was later one of the tracks of her debut album Supersize. In February, her second single, "Gib ihm", was released, reaching number one in the German Charts. Five weeks after the release of "Gib ihm", David was featured on the track "Affalterbach" by German rapper Shindy. About two weeks later, David released the song "ICE", which was followed by "Fliegst du mit" in May. At the end of June 2019, she published the single "On Off" featuring Maître Gims, which was followed by the single "Brillis" in August. On 20 September 2019, she released both the single "Nur mit dir" featuring German singer Xavier Naidoo and her album Supersize, which peaked at number one on the German Album Charts. She became the first national female solo hip-hop artist to reach number one with an album as well as the first female hip hop act to top the charts with her debut album.

In a YouTube video released in September 2019, David announced her second perfume was set to come out in October 2019, after she had already sold a perfume as part of a collaboration with dm-drogerie since 2014. The newest fragrance is a collaboration with Douglas and a first sample of it is found in the limited content box to her album Supersize.

After David had already released two merchandising collections in November 2016 and June 2017 in collaboration with Holymesh, she released a pair of slippers with "GIB IHM" printed on in April 2020.

David released the single "90-60-111" on 24 April 2020 which turned being her second number one-hit in Germany, as well as her first number one-single in Austria. She also released a limited merchandise collection for the single. Two weeks after the release of "90-60-111", David was featured on the track "Conan x Xenia" by German rapper Haftbefehl. Later in 2020, she released her song "Hoe's Up G's Down". Later, she released the song "Never Know" with German rapper Luciano, which debuted in the top 10 in Germany, Austria, and Switzerland. Her second studio album, Bitches brauchen Rap, was released on 19 November 2021.

Discography

Studio albums

Singles

As lead artist

As featured artist

Other charted songs

Perfume line 
In 2017, David brought her own perfume out called "Shirin David — Created by the Community" in cooperation with dm-drogerie. Her fans had the chance to vote for their personal preferences  during a specific time and created the perfume as a community. For her second perfume, "Shirin David — Created by Shirin", she cooperated with Douglas.

 2017: Shirin David — Created by the Community (in cooperation with dm-drogerie)
 2019: Shirin David — Created by Shirin (in cooperation with Douglas)

DirTea 
In late summer 2021, David brought her own ice tea line called DirTea ("Dir" stands for dirty; "Tea" stands for tea) out. Three different tastes called Candy Shop (Cotton Candy), Wet Peach (Peach) and Busty Blueberry (Blueberry) came out.

Following her release of her sophomore album Bitches brauchen Rap, David released a sparkling edition (with alcohol), including the two sorts Juicy Mango (Mango) and Candy Shop. In 2022, there will also be a zero-sugar edition coming out. The drinks are available in Germany, Austria and Switzerland, including online and in specific-chosen retailers.

Filmography

Film

Television

Awards and nominations

Results

References

1995 births
Living people
German people of Iranian descent
German people of Lithuanian descent
German women rappers
21st-century German women singers